A scimitar is a type of sword.

Scimitar may also refer to:

Military
 HMS Scimitar, three ships of the Royal Navy
 Scimitar-class patrol vessel, a Royal Navy class
 Supermarine Scimitar, a Royal Navy fighter aircraft
 Armstrong Whitworth Scimitar, a biplane fighter aircraft first flown in 1935
 FV107 Scimitar, a type of light tank used by the British Army
 Operation Scimitar, a 2005 coalition counterinsurgency operation of the Iraq War

Technology
 Scimitar antenna, a type of aerospace radio antenna
 Scimitar propeller, a type of aircraft propeller
 Reliant Scimitar, a sports car
 Masak Scimitar, a glider designed and built by Peter Masak
 Reaction Engines Scimitar, an aircraft engine
 Scimitar (game engine), a video game engine
 Split scimitar winglets, a type of wingtip device

Popular culture
 Scimitar (Marvel Comics), a Marvel Comics villain

Fictional ships
 Scimitar medium fighter, a fictional starfighter from the Wing Commander universe
 Scimitar (Star Trek), a fictional starship in the film Star Trek: Nemesis
 Scimitar (Star Wars), the personal spaceship of Darth Maul in the Star Wars universe

Other uses
 Abbeville Scimitar, a newspaper of Abbeville, South Carolina, published between 1914–1917
 Cimeter or scimitar, a type of butcher's knife
 Scimitar cat (Homotherium serum), an extinct species of the cat family
 Scimitar Glacier, Washington State, United States
 Scimitar oryx, a species of oryx
 Scimitar syndrome, a rare congenital heart defect
 Scimitar-billed woodcreeper, a bird species in the family Dendrocolaptinae
 Scimitar-winged piha, a species of bird in the family Cotingidae
 Scimitar, an entry-level cymbal series from manufacturer Zildjian

See also
 Symitar (disambiguation)